Parapodium  is a genus of flowering plants of the family Apocynaceae, first described as a genus in 1838. It is native to South Africa.

Species
 Parapodium costatum E.Mey. -  South Africa
 Parapodium crispum N.E.Br. -  South Africa
 Parapodium simile N.E.Br. - South Africa

References

Apocynaceae genera
Asclepiadoideae
Flora of South Africa